Akademen is a Finland-Swedish colloquial name for at least two separate organizations:
 The Academic Male Voice Choir of Helsinki, a Finland-Swedish choir in Helsinki
 The Academic Bookstore, a Finnish bookstore chain, previously owned by Stockmann,  owned by Bonnier Books

See also
 The Swedish Academy